Edin Forto (born 16 August 1972) is a Bosnian politician serving as Minister of Communication and Traffic since January 2023. He previously served twice as Prime Minister of Sarajevo Canton, first from 2018 to 2020, and then from 2021 to 2023. Since September 2021, Forto has also been the president of Our Party.

Following the 2014 general election, Forto became a member of the Federal House of Peoples. Before becoming president, he was the vice president of Our Party.

Early career
Forto was born in Sarajevo on 16 August 1972, where he graduated from "Ognjen Prica" high school in 1991. During the Bosnian War from 1992 to 1995, he worked as a journalist, editor, and DJ for several creative and media outlets, including Obala Art Center, Radio ZID, Radio 202, and BH Dani magazine.

Following the end of the war, Forto moved to the United States in September 1995. He received a BA in Media and Journalism from the University of North Carolina at Chapel Hill in 1999. Two years later, he graduated in international affairs from Columbia University. He spent two years at Eurasia Group, a political consultancy in New York City, before moving back to Sarajevo in 2003, when he joined Nexe Group, a Croatian industrial company specializing in construction materials and road building.

Political career
Forto remained with Nexe group until August 2015 when he became a politician. After the 2014 general election, he became a member of the Federal House of Peoples, the upper chamber of the Federal Parliament.

Forto served as Prime Minister of Sarajevo Canton from 26 December 2018 until 3 March 2020. Following the 2020 municipal elections, he was once again chosen as the Sarajevo Canton Prime Minister, taking office on 5 January 2021.

On 4 September 2021, Forto became the new president of the social-liberal Our Party. He became the party's president after his predecessor, Predrag Kojović, resigned from his position as president.

On 25 January 2023, following the formation of a new Council of Ministers presided over by Borjana Krišto, Forto was appointed as the new Minister of Communication and Traffic within Krišto's government.

Personal life
Forto lives in Sarajevo. He is married and has two children. His hobbies include playing guitar and basketball.

On 9 September 2021, Forto was successfully treated for inflammation of the cervical spine nerve, which he was diagnosed with the previous month.

References

External links

Edin Forto at biografija.org

1972 births
Living people
Politicians from Sarajevo
Bosnia and Herzegovina atheists
Bosnia and Herzegovina politicians
Politicians of the Federation of Bosnia and Herzegovina
Our Party (Bosnia and Herzegovina) politicians
Government ministers of Bosnia and Herzegovina